The Dent de Morcles is a 2,969 metres high mountain located at western end of the Bernese Alps, overlooking the Rhone between Martigny and St. Maurice. It is the westernmost summit of the Muverans massif, which in turn is the westernmost of the four distinct mountain massifs of the Bernese Alps that lie west of the Gemmi Pass. Its position at the end of this chain of mountains and the abrupt drop to the wide valley of the Rhone river below make the Dent de Morcles prominently visible from many points in Lausanne and other populated areas on the north and northeastern shores of Lake Geneva.

The summit is sometimes distinguished by the name Grande Dent de Morcles, the Petite Dent de Morcles being a lower summit (2,929 m) on the north-west side. Both summits are located on the border between Valais and Vaud.

On the northern slopes lies the small Glacier des Martinets. The Lac de Fully is located on the south side.

References

External links
Dent de Morcles on Summitpost

Bernese Alps
Mountains of the Alps
Mountains of Switzerland
Mountains of the canton of Vaud
Mountains of Valais
Valais–Vaud border
Two-thousanders of Switzerland